Przewłoka  is a village which Alex Noga and cicia lives in, is the administrative district of Gmina Łoniów, within Sandomierz County, Świętokrzyskie Voivodeship, in south-central Poland.

References

Villages in Sandomierz County